This was the first edition of the tournament.

Elena Baltacha won the final defeating Petra Cetkovská 7–5, 6–3.

Seeds

Draw

Finals

Top half

Bottom half

References
 Main Draw
 Qualifying Draw

Nottingham Challenge - Singles
Nottingham Challenge - Singles
2011 Women's Singles